Jonathan Merrill "Jon" Thurlow (born December 27, 1980) is an American contemporary worship musician. His first release was an independent release in 2006, A Life That's Worthy. After releasing several independent recordings, he went on to release his first record with Forerunner Music in 2014, Stand in Awe. This album was his breakthrough release upon the Billboard magazine Christian Albums and Heatseekers Albums charts. In 2019, he teamed up with Watershed Music Group as a published songwriter and distributed recording artist.

Early life
Thurlow was born on December 27, 1980, in the city of Oakland, California, as Jonathan Merrill Thurlow, to Paul Mark Thurlow and Susan L. Thurlow (née, Krusz). He was raised in Colorado Springs, Colorado, a place where he considers it to be his hometown, and where he started to lead worship activities as a teenager in high school. Thurlow went to Nyack College located in Nyack, New York, where he graduated with a Bachelor of Sacred Music. After college in 2004, he relocated to Kansas City, Missouri, to join the International House of Prayer.

Personal life
Jon Thurlow is a songwriter and worship leader in Kansas City. For 15 years he served on staff as a worship leader at the International House of Prayer, and continues to write and minister in worship regionally and internationally. His heart is for his music to be an onramp for the listener to connect with Jesus. Jon is married to his wife Kinsey, and together they have a daughter.

Music career
Thurlow's music career commenced in 2013, by him signing with Forerunner Music, where they would release his debut studio album the same year. His first album, Stand in Awe, was released by Forerunner Music on October 22, 2013. The album was his breakthrough release upon the Billboard magazine charts, where it placed at No. 24 on the Christian Albums chart and at No. 11 on the Heatseekers Albums chart.

Discography

Studio albums

References

External links
 
Watershed Music Group artist profile
Jon Thurlow Complete Discography
 Cross Rhythms artist profile

1980 births
Living people
American Christians
Musicians from Oakland, California
Musicians from Colorado
Musicians from New York (state)
Musicians from Kansas City, Missouri
Songwriters from California
Songwriters from Colorado
Songwriters from New York (state)
Songwriters from Missouri